Kele language may refer to:
Kele language (New Guinea)
Kele language (Congo)
Kele language (Gabon)
Kele language (Nigeria)

See also 
 Kele languages, a Bantu subgroup